Oxhey Golf Club is a golf course located near Watford in Hertfordshire, England. The course first opened for play on 4 May 1912 with a match between Ted Ray, the Oxhey professional, and Harry Vardon of South Hertfordshire, the latter also being the course designer. Ray played fine golf while Vardon struggled with his putting. Ray won the match 4&2. The course has been host to several important tournaments including the News of the World PGA Match Play Tournament and the McVitie & Price Tournament.

The club ceased to operate and was closed down on 31 October 1946. In 1991 the course was re-opened as a nine-hole course and became known as Oxhey Park Golf Club.

It is now permanently closed.

Early history
Oxhey Golf Club, located near Watford in Hertfordshire, was first opened for play on 12 May 1912. Ted Ray served as the club professional from 1912 until 1940.

First World War
A little more than two years after the course was opened for play, the First World War began on 28 July 1914 and the war had a detrimental effect on the club, causing 58 members to resign. Of that total were eight women members who also submitted their resignations. Five of the groundskeepers joined the army and still more volunteered but were not eligible for service. Nineteen of the caddies also answered the call for military duty. The club's steward joined the Royal Marine Pension Reserve and reported for duty at Gosport.

By 5 May 1916, the war had already taken a toll on Oxhey caddies and greenkeepers with 5 casualties: 2 killed, 2 wounded, 1 prisoner. Among the club members there were 9 casualties: 3 killed, 5 wounded, 1 prisoner. In May 1917, the course had fallen into disrepair due to a lack of groundskeepers. By then some 84 members were serving in the army or navy, and a groundsman had been killed and another was a prisoner of war.

Poor course conditions
The bunkers were suffering from the play of lambs and sheep who were also drinking water from the water boxes near the tees. A fire at the club had destroyed the caddie master’s and professional’s shed but the structures were quickly rebuilt. The winter of 1915–16 had been very cold and it was beneficial to the course. The deep freeze helped to drain the course in the spring of 1916. In the prior year there had been mud problems on the course since there had been a three-year stretch without frost, two of which were exceptionally wet.

Post First World War history
A problem with worms on the course had erupted by May 1920 and getting rid of them had become a priority. The course was reported as being in a "shocking condition" as a result of five years of neglect of the greens and damage caused by grazing sheep. By this time the club's greenkeeper had returned to work at the course after the war but his physical condition was reported as "badly damaged". Hunters had been shooting grouse on the course but were ordered to cease.

Later history
By 1921, the condition of the course had been improved to the point that it was selected to host the 1921 McVitie & Price Tournament. The English professional Abe Mitchell won the 1921 tournament by two strokes from Joe Kirkwood, Sr.

Tournaments hosted

1921 McVitie & Price Tournament

The News of the World PGA Match Play tournament was held at Oxhey Golf Club on three occasions: in 1921, 1930, and 1936.

Course closure and re-opening
After failing to obtain a lease for the land, the course was closed on 31 October 1946. The course was re-opened in 1991 as a 9-hole course and became known as Oxhey Park Golf Club.

Photo gallery

Notes
The course detail shown in the upper right corner of this article shows the specifications of the Oxhey Golf Club when it was an 18-hole course prior to its closure in 1946.

References

Golf clubs and courses in Hertfordshire
Sports venues in Hertfordshire
Sports organizations established in 1912